Magik Six: Live in Amsterdam is the sixth album in the Magik series by well-known trance DJ and producer Tiësto. As with the rest of the Magik series, the album is a live turntable mix. It was recorded on June 23, 2000, during a Wildlife event at Melkweg, Amsterdam.

Track listing
Mixed Version
 Afterburn – "Fratty Boy" – 6:05 (Mislabeled, Original Name is Afterburn – "North Pole" )
 Sunburst – "Eyeball" [John Johnson Remix] – 4:32
 Yahel and Eyal Barkan – "Voyage" – 4:29
 Free Radical – "Surreal" [En Motion Remix] – 4:15
 Fire & Ice – "Forever Young" – 5:35 (Mislabeled, Original Name is Fire & Ice – "Silent Cry")
 The Swimmer – "Purple Cloud" – 5:09
 Delerium – "Silence" [DJ Tiësto In Search Of Sunrise Remix] – 6:25
 Moogwai – "Viola" [Armin van Buuren Remix] – 7:41
 Kamaya Painters – "Wasteland" – 4:27
 Cloud 69 – "Sixty Nine Ways" – 5:51
 Airwave – "Escape From Nowhere" – 5:49
 Dawnseekers – "Gothic Dream" [John Johnson Remix] – 4:35
 Push – "Till We Meet Again" [Album Mix] – 4:39
 VDM – "No Hesitation" – 3:18
 Pulser – "Cloudwalking" [Astral Mix] – 4:49

Unmixed Version
 Afterburn – "Fratty Boy" – 7:17 (Mislabeled, Original Name is Afterburn – "North Pole" )
 Sunburst – "Eyeball" [John Johnson Remix] – 8:17
 Yahel and Eyal Barkan – "Voyage" – 6:23
 Free Radical – "Surreal" [En Motion Remix] – 6:51
 Fire & Ice – "Forever Young" – 10:09 (Mislabeled, Original Name is Fire & Ice – "Silent Cry")
 The Swimmer – "Purple Cloud" – 6:17
 Delerium – "Silence" [DJ Tiësto In Search Of Sunrise Remix] – 11:33
 Moogwai – "Viola" [Armin van Buuren Remix] – 9:55
 Kamaya Painters – "Wasteland" – 7:41
 Cloud 69 – "Sixty Nine Ways" – 8:11
 Airwave – "Escape From Nowhere" – 11:19
 Dawnseekers – "Gothic Dream" [John Johnson Remix] – 6:38
 Push – "Till We Meet Again" [Album Mix] – 8:32
 VDM – "No Hesitation" – 6:06
 Pulser – "Cloudwalking" [Astral Mix] – 9:59

Tiësto compilation albums
2000 compilation albums
Black Hole Recordings albums